Bashir Dalhatu (born 12 November 1949), titled Wazirin Dutse, is a Nigerian aristocrat and statesman.

Biography 
Bashir Dalhatu was born in Dutse on November 12, 1949. He attended Rumfa College, Kano from 1963 to 1967. In 1972, he received a bachelor's degree in law from the Ahmadu Bello University in Zaria, and was subsequently called to the bar in 1973 before later studying law in London.

He served in the Government of Kano State in various ministries: the Kano State Ministry of Works and Survey and Ministry of Agriculture, before later becoming state counsel in the Ministry of Justice. He later founded a private practice B. M. Dalhatu & Co. in Kano.

In 1993, Dalhatu served in the Interim National Government as the Secretary of Transport and Aviation. He also served in Sani Abacha's government as Minister of Power and Steel from 1993 to 1997; and Minister of Internal Affairs from 1997 to 1998, and later married Abacha's daughter.

In 2018, he was promoted from Walin Dutse, to succeed his brother Muktar Muhammed as the Waziri (chief adviser to the Emir) of the Dutse Emirate. Dalhatu is also the honorary consul to Tunisia.

Political interests 
He was elected into the 1978 constituent assembly that produced the 1979 Constitution. At the conclusion of the assembly, he became one of the founding members of the National Party of Nigeria where, between 1979 and 1983, he was the assistant national legal advisor, Kano State assistant secretary, and state secretary.

He was later an executive member of the National Republican Convention and chairman of the Think Tank of the Presidential Campaign. He later became a founding member of the Peoples Democratic Party, before leaving to contest for Governor of Jigawa State under the All Nigeria Peoples Party. 

In 2006, in opposition to Olusegun Obasanjo, Dalhatu founded the Advanced Congress of Democrats, before later merging the party with the Action Congress of Nigeria, where he was the national secretary until resigning in 2007, after the party refused to join Umaru Yar'Adua's government.

Business 
He is the Vice Chairman of Freedom Radio Nigeria, one of the most popular stations in Northern Nigeria. He became the Chairman of the New Nigeria Development Corporation in 2015. He is also the Chairman of Highland Waters and Marketing Limited.

He was a Member, Board of Directors at Nigerian Ports Authority and a member of both the Nigerian Bar Association as well as the International Bar Association.

See also
Jigawa State

References

1949 births
Living people
People from Jigawa State
Rumfa College alumni
Ahmadu Bello University alumni